Aileen McLeod (born 24 August 1971) is a Scottish National Party (SNP) politician. She is a former Member of the European Parliament (MEP) for the Scotland constituency, having been elected in the 2019 European Parliament election. She served as MEP until the 31 January 2020 when the Brexit process was completed.

She was also formerly a Member of the Scottish Parliament (MSP) for the South Scotland region 2011−2016 and was the Minister for Environment, Climate Change and Land Reform 2014−2016.

Early life and education
McLeod was born on 24 August 1971 in East Kilbride, Scotland. She attended Claremont High School going on to study at the University of Edinburgh, graduating in 1993 with a degree in German and European Community studies. In 2004 she graduated with a PhD from the University of Central Lancashire.

Political career
McLeod joined the SNP in 2004 after leaving her restricted post in the Scottish Parliament. After spending five years living in Brussels and working as Head of Policy for Alyn Smith MEP, McLeod returned to Scotland in 2009 to stand as an SNP candidate in the European Parliamentary elections. From 2009 to 2011 McLeod was Parliamentary Assistant to Michael Russell MSP.

In 2011 McLeod was elected to the Scottish Parliament via the South Scotland regional list after losing in the constituency of Galloway and West Dumfries to Alex Fergusson.

On 21 November 2014, she was appointed Minister for Environment, Climate Change and Land Reform, succeeding Paul Wheelhouse who was moved to another ministerial brief. She attended the 2015 United Nations Climate Change Conference in Paris. She had looked at issues relating to land ownership, with some efforts made to increase transparency of this.

In the 2016 Scottish Parliament election she again stood as a candidate in the Galloway and West Dumfries constituency where she finished second behind Finlay Carson (who had a majority of 1,514 votes) and was not returned to the Parliament as a result. She was succeeded as Cabinet Secretary for Environment, Climate Change and Land Reform by Roseanna Cunningham.

European Parliament
McLeod was elected as a Member of the European Parliament for the Scotland constituency in the 2019 European Parliament election. In September 2019 McLeod was a member of the European Parliament's delegation to the 2019 UN Climate Action Summit She served as MEP until 31 January 2020, when the Brexit process was completed.

See also
Alyn Smith
Christian Allard
Heather Anderson

References

External links 
 

1971 births
Living people
People from East Kilbride
People from Lanark
Alumni of the University of Edinburgh
Alumni of the University of Central Lancashire
Scottish civil servants
Scottish National Party MEPs
Scottish National Party MSPs
Members of the Scottish Parliament 2011–2016
MEPs for Scotland 2019–2020
21st-century women MEPs for Scotland
Ministers of the Scottish Government
Women members of the Scottish Government